Andaray District is one of eight districts of the province Condesuyos in Peru.

See also 
 Coropuna
 Pallaqucha

References